Maciej Rybiński (5 March 1945 – 22 October 2009) was a Polish journalist, publicist, satirist and writer.

References

1945 births
2009 deaths